Heedoosh ("revelation") is an Israeli-American Jewish hard rock band from New York City. They were formed in 2005 by brothers Yaniv and Yahav Tsaidi, and released their debut album, Meumkah Delibah ("Depth of the Heart"), in 2006.

History
Heedoosh was founded by brothers Yaniv and Yahav Tsaidi, who were born in Israel but grew up in Detroit with Yemenite-Moroccan parents. Yaniv began his career as a Hasidic pop singer in Chicago, recording two solo albums and performing on the 2004 Am Yisrael Chai tour alongside Reva L'Sheva and Adi Ran; eventually, however, he decided to take his music in a rock direction.

The Tsaidis formed Heedoosh in New York City in 2005, collaborating with Brooklyn-based producer/guitarist Eli Massias and drummer Ari Leichtberg. That same year, they performed at the Triad Theater, played the Jewish music festival Yidstock at Monticello Raceway, and opened for Badfish.

Their debut album, Meumkah Delibah, was released on May 9, 2006. Ben Jacobson of The Jerusalem Post listed it as the number one Jewish album of the year, describing the songs "Etz Hayim," "Lev Tahor," "Bein Mayim L'Yayin" and "The Purim Song" as "among the greatest rock songs ever to focus on Jewish themes." After a brief hiatus, the band returned in December and performed at New York's Lion's Den alongside Hamakor.

In 2008, the band relocated to Israel with a new lineup, including lead guitarist Dror Shimoni, guitarist Shaya Rubenstein, and bassist Rafi Gassel, who had previously played with Yaniv in the American band Rashan. They performed their first Israeli concert in June at the Canaan Land club in downtown Jerusalem.

Musical style
Heedoosh plays a grunge style influenced by Oasis, Nirvana, Radiohead, and Alice in Chains, with Jewish-influenced Hebrew lyrics.

Members
Current members
Yaniv Tsaidi – vocals
Yahav Tsaidi – guitar, vocals
Dror Shimoni – lead guitar
Shaya Rubenstein – guitar
Raffi Gassel – bass
Ari Leichtberg – drums

Former members
Daniel Engelman – bass
Guy Engelman – guitar
Meir Weinberg (Mizrach) – guitar / backing vocals
Gary Levitt – bass
Yoshie Fruchter – guitar (Zion80, Soulfarm)
Donni Rothchild – guitar
Eli Massias – guitar
Avi Hoffman – bass (Blue Fringe)

Discography
Albums
Meumkah Delibah (2006)

References 

Jewish rock groups
American emigrants to Israel
Alternative rock groups from New York (state)
Grunge musical groups
Yemenite Orthodox Jews
Musical groups established in 2005
2005 establishments in New York City
Musical groups from New York City